The Messe des pêcheurs de Villerville (Mass of the fishermen of Villerville) is a missa brevis written by Gabriel Fauré in collaboration with his former pupil André Messager. A later version, published as Messe basse contained only movements composed by Fauré.

Messe des pêcheurs de Villerville (1881)
Fauré and Messager worked together on the mass in the summer of 1881.

The sections of the mass run as follows:
 Kyrie (Messager)
 Gloria (Fauré)
 Sanctus (Fauré)
 O Salutaris (Messager)
 Agnus Dei (Fauré)

The first performance took place in Villerville on 4 September 1881 accompanied by a harmonium and a violin.  The concert was in aid of the fishermen's charitable association. Messager orchestrated the first four sections, and Fauré the last. A second performance, this time accompanied by orchestra, was given in Villerville the following year.

Messe basse (published 1907)
In 1907, Heugel & Cie. published a version of the mass, removing Messager's sections and the Gloria (apart from a part of its music that was reused for the added Benedictus), and incorporating a new Kyrie by Fauré; this version, produced by Fauré in 1906, appeared under the title Messe basse.

References

Masses (music)
Compositions by Gabriel Fauré
Compositions by André Messager
Collaborations in classical music
1881 compositions